Ganei Yehuda was a moshav founded in 1950 in the Ono Valley, adjacent to the cities of Yehud and Kiryat Ono. Ganei Yehuda was officially merged with Savyon in 2003.

The moshav was named "Ganei Yehuda" after the biblical figure Judah whom was the fourth son of Jacob and Leah and the founder of the Israelite Tribe of Judah.

Both Savyon and Ganei Yehuda are located on the land of the Palestinian village of Al-'Abbasiyya (formerly Al-Yahudiyya), which became depopulated in the 1948 Arab–Israeli War.

Notable residents

 Yoav Cohen (born 1999), Israeli Olympic windsurfer

References

Moshavim
Populated places established in 1950